Amphiregulin, also known as AREG, is a protein synthesized as a transmembrane glycoprotein with 252 aminoacids and it is encoded by the AREG  gene. in humans.

Function 
The protein encoded by this gene is a member of the epidermal growth factor (EGF) family.

It is a critical autocrine growth factor as well as a mitogen for astrocytes, Schwann cells, and fibroblasts. It is ligand for epidermal growth factor (EGF) and it is related to transforming growth factor alpha (TGF-alpha). This protein interacts with the Epidermal growth factor receptor (EGFR) to promote the growth of normal epithelial cells.

Biological role
AREG is a critical factor in estrogen action and ductal development of the mammary glands. Amphiregulin has been found to be essential for mammary ductal development, as evidenced by absence of ductal growth in amphiregulin knockout mice. This is similar to the phenotypes of EGFR and ERα knockout mice, which also show absence of ductal growth. Amphiregulin is expressed in many parts of body such as ovaries, placenta, pancreas, breasts, lungs and spleen. Expression of amphiregulin can be induced by TGF-α, TNF-α, interleukin 1, and prostaglandins.

Clinical significance

Psoriasis 
Mutations in this encoded protein are associated with a psoriasis-like skin phenotype. Higher circulating levels of amphiregulin are associated with AGVHD progression.

Cancer 
Overexpression of amphiregulin is connected with cancer of the breast, prostate, colon, pancreas, lung, spleen, and bladder.

Rheumatoid arthritis 
It seems that expression of AREG is connected with proliferation of fibroblasts and production of proinflammatory cytokines interleukin 8 and vascular endothelial growth factor (VEGF).

Inflammation 
Amphiregulin is part of cellular response type 2. It was found that the cell source of amphiregulin is innate lymphoid cells 2 (ILC2) which are dependent on interleukin 33. ILC2 expressed amphiregulin after tissue damage of the intestines and activation by IL-33. Moreover, endogenous AREG with IL-33 decreased the intestinal inflammation in mice with normal count of T-lymphocytes and in deficient mice.

References

Further reading

External links 
 
 
 

Estrogen regulation